Nuhiji is a surname. Notable people with the surname include:

Arbën Nuhiji (born 1972), Macedonian footballer
Ardijan Nuhiji (born 1978), Macedonian footballer